Grass Valley is a neighborhood in Oakland, California. Located in East Oakland in the hills east of Bishop O'Dowd High School and the Oakland Zoo. It straddles upper Golf Links Road and lies just west of Skyline Road's end. It is adjacent to the Lake Chabot Golf Course. It is home to Fire Station #28, Grass Valley Elementary School and East Bay Bible Church.     

Neighborhoods in Oakland, California